Dysomma polycatodon is an eel in the family Synaphobranchidae (cutthroat eels). It was described by Christine Karrer in 1983. It is a tropical, marine eel which is known from the Indo-Pacific. It is known to dwell at a depth range of 170–175 metres.

References

Synaphobranchidae
Taxa named by Christine Karrer
Fish described in 1983